Kylee Saunders (born 25 May 1994), sometimes known mononymously as Kylee, is an American singer who is signed with Sony Music Japan's DefStar Records label.

Early life and career

Kylee Saunders was born in Chandler, Arizona, to a Japanese mother and British American father. Her father inspired her to become a singer. She has a younger sister and a younger brother. When she was eleven years old, she passed an audition to perform the national anthem at the opening of an NBA game, earning a standing ovation. This performance earned her the interest of music producers, and she was signed onto the independent label RX-Records. Saunders attended Stoller Middle School in Portland, Oregon, until 2007, when she returned to Arizona. She then attended Hamilton High School and in 2016 graduated from Stanford University with a bachelor's degree.

On October 17, 2008, her first single, "Vacancy", was released by RX-Records in the United States as a digital single. "Vacancy" was featured as the ending theme to the Sony Computer Entertainment anime series Xam'd: Lost Memories. On March 24, 2010, Saunders released her first major-label single under Sony Music Japan's label DefStar Records, titled , which was featured as the theme song to the 2010 film Memoirs of a Teenage Amnesiac, a Japan-America co-production in which she also gave a cameo performance. Her second major-label single, "Missing/It's You", was slated for release on July 7, 2010, with "Missing" being the second opening theme song to the Bones and Stan Lee anime Heroman. She also performed as one of the opening acts for the 2010 Summer Sonic Festival, playing on the Urban/Dance Stage. This was followed by her single "Everlasting", which was used as the  theme song for the second episode of the Mobile Suit Gundam Unicorn OVA series. Saunders appeared on NBC's Today in the United States on May 13, 2011, where she was interviewed by Hoda Kotb and Kathie Lee Gifford, before she performed her fourth major single "Never Give Up". Kylee performed at Otakon 2011 on July 31, 2011, in Baltimore, Maryland, her US concert debut. Her fifth major single, "Crazy for You", was released on October 5, 2011; the song was used in Japanese online clothing retailer Nissen's 2011 fall collection television commercial. Saunders released her debut album, 17, on November 23, 2011. She also did a duet with Sam Tsui in May 2013.
She was married August 2017.

Discography

The RX-Records era (2008–2009)

Single

EP

The DefStar Records era (2009–)

Singles

Digital singles

EPs

Studio albums

Album appearances

Live performances

2009
 Hurley NIGHTS Vol. 0
 Summer Sonic Festival

2010
 Girl Pop Factory
 Summer Sonic Festival

2011
 NBC's TODAY show
 Otakon
 Minami Wheel
 Girls Award by CROOZ blog 2011 Autumn/Winter
 FIFA Club World Cup

2012
 Otodama Sea Studio (Japan)
 MTV ZUSHI FES 12 supported by RIVIERA (Japan)
 J-POP Summit Festival (USA)
 Inazuma Rock Fes (Japan)

2013
 Northern California Cherry Blossom Festival (USA)
 Japan Day @ Central Park (USA)
 Japan Expo (France)
 J-POP Summit Festival (USA)

2014
 Playlist Live (USA)
 J-POP Summit Festival (USA)

Covers on YouTube
Kylee started a covers project on YouTube.

Management
Kylee is managed in the US and Japan by Antinos Management America.

References

External links

  by DefStar Records
  by RX-Records

1994 births
Living people
American expatriates in Japan
American musicians of Japanese descent
American people of British descent
Defstar Records artists
Japanese women singers
Japanese people of British descent
Singers from Arizona
21st-century American singers
21st-century Japanese singers
21st-century American women singers
Stanford University alumni